L'Amante du Rif is a film co-produced by Morocco, Belgium and France, directed by Moroccan filmmaker Narjiss Nejjar and released in 2011. The film, a loose adaption of the novel of the same name written by Nejjar's mother, Noufissa Sbaï, was screened at multiple film festivals.

Synopsis 
The film, set in Chefchaouen, chronicles the tragic destiny of Aya, a rebellious young woman who crosses paths with a drug trafficker, The Baron.

Cast 
 Nadia Kounda (Aya)
 Mourade Zeguendi (The Baron)
 Ouidad Elma (Radia)
 Nadia Niazi (Aya's mother)
 Fehd Benchamsi (Ahed)
 Omar Lotfi (Hafid)
 Siham Assif (prison guard)
 Raoula (diva)

References

External links 
 

Belgian multilingual films
French multilingual films